Rachel Joy Shenton (born 21 December 1987) is an English actress, screenwriter, and activist. She gained prominence through her role as Mitzeee Minniver in the Channel 4 soap opera Hollyoaks (2010–2013). She has since starred in the ABC Family drama Switched at Birth (2014–2017), the BBC2 sitcom White Gold (2019), and the Channel 5 series All Creatures Great and Small (2020–).

In 2018, Shenton won an Academy Award for her short film The Silent Child.

Early life
Shenton attended two high schools, one in Cheadle. After high school Shenton went on to study performing arts at Stoke-on-Trent College (Burslem Campus). In between studying and acting roles, she volunteered at her local charity, Deaflinks.

Career

Early career
Shenton's acting career began with small recurring parts in various television series such as Holby City and Waterloo Road. She also filmed various television commercials for the Ministry of Defence, DFS and Sega Superstars Tennis and appeared in two British films. She continued recurring appearances in 2008 appearing in Nickelodeon's series Genie in the House and Five's Sophia's Diary, playing Sofia's wayward sister 'Trisha'.

Hollyoaks
In April 2010, it was announced that Shenton had been cast in Hollyoaks as Mitzeee Minniver, an aspiring glamour model. Shenton described her character as being the complete opposite of her. Her casting came as part of new producer Paul Marquess' major revamp of the serial. Before her character had appeared on-screen Shenton received media attention for her image, with tabloids reporting on her likeness to Cheryl Cole.
Shenton described the attention and comparisons as "very flattering". On 20 December 2012, Shenton announced her decision to leave Hollyoaks. Shenton's final scenes as Mitzeee aired on 15 February 2013, when the character moved to the United States.

Further roles and The Silent Child
On 28 April 2014, it was announced that Shenton would make her US television debut in season 3 of the ABC Family drama Switched at Birth, playing young student teacher, Lilly Summers. Shenton went on to shoot season 4 and 5 which was when the show ended. The final season aired in February 2017.

In August 2017, Shenton appeared in The Silent Child, a film which she created and co-produced with her husband Chris Overton. The film was based on Shenton's own experiences as the child of a parent who became deaf. The film features profoundly deaf six-year-old first-time actor Maisie Sly as the titular child. British Sign Language (BSL) is used in the film. 

The film won best short film at the Rhode Island International Film Festival in August 2017. This made it eligible for entry to the Oscars. In December 2017 the film was selected as one of the final ten films in the Live Action Short Film category for the 90th Academy Awards. On 23 January 2018, it was announced that The Silent Child had been nominated for the Academy Award for Best Live Action Short Film for the 90th Academy Awards, which it then won. Shenton kept a promise that she had made to their young lead actress and signed her acceptance speech.

In March 2019, Shenton joined the cast of BBC2 comedy series White Gold playing motivational speaker turned window saleswoman Jo Scott, alongside James Buckley and Joe Thomas.

In September 2020, she began appearing in the Channel 5 and PBS adaptation of All Creatures Great and Small as Helen Alderson. Significant changes were made from the source material (both the previous television series and the memoir), allowing the role of Helen to be greatly expanded. The programme was renewed for a second series, which aired in September 2021, with a third series broadcast in 2022.

Personal life
When Shenton was 12, her father became deaf after undergoing chemotherapy treatment for cancer. Following the death of her father, Shenton learned British Sign Language. In 2011, Shenton was made ambassador for the National Deaf Children's Society and she continues to raise awareness of deafness in the UK.

In March 2011, Shenton completed a skydive in aid of National Deaf Children's Society. In February 2012, Shenton announced that she was due to climb Mount Kilimanjaro in aid of the charity. In May 2011, Shenton helped to launch a social networking website for deaf people named "Viewtalk". In October 2012, she climbed the BT Tower in aid of Action on Hearing Loss. She married Chris Overton in October 2018.

Outside of acting, Shenton ran acting classes for students at The Midlands Screen Acting School from 2013.

Filmography

Acting

Voice over

Awards and nominations

References

External links
Official website
Rachel Shenton at The Spotlight

English film actresses
English soap opera actresses
English television actresses
English voice actresses
Producers who won the Live Action Short Film Academy Award
Living people
Actors from Staffordshire
1987 births